The 1980 Winter Olympics, formally known as the XIII Olympic Winter Games, took place February 13 through 24, 1980 in Lake Placid, New York, United States.  A total of 1,072 athletes representing 37 National Olympic Committees took part.  There were 38 medal events contested at these Olympics.

Venues for the events were the Olympic Center (later renamed Herb Brooks Arena), Whiteface Mountain, Mt. Van Hoevenberg Olympic Bobsled Run, the Olympic Ski Jumps, the Cascade Cross Country Ski Center, and the Lake Placid High School Speed Skating Oval.

Alpine skiing

Biathlon

Bobsleigh

Cross-country skiing

Figure skating

Ice Hockey

Luge

Nordic combined

Ski jumping

Speed skating

Medal leaders

Athletes that won at least two gold medals or at least three total medals are listed below.

See also
 1980 Winter Olympics medal table

References

External links

1980
1980 Winter Olympics